The Tavistock Institute of Human Relations is a British not-for-profit organisation that applies social science to contemporary issues and problems. It was initiated in 1946, when it developed from the Tavistock Clinic, and was formally established as a separate entity in September 1947. The journal Human Relations is published on behalf of the Tavistock Institute by Sage Publications. The institute is located in Gee Street in Clerkenwell, London.

History of the Tavistock Institute
The early history of the Tavistock Institute overlaps with that of the Tavistock Clinic because many of the staff from the Clinic worked on new, large-scale projects during World War II, and it was as a result of this work that the institute was established.

During the war, staff from the Tavistock Clinic played key roles in British Army psychiatry. Working with colleagues in the Royal Army Medical Corps and the British Army, they were responsible for innovations such as the War Office Selection Boards (WOSBs) and Civil Resettlement Units (CRUs). The group that formed around the WOSBs and CRUs were fascinated by this work with groups and organisations, and sought to continue research in this field after the war. Various influential figures had visited the WOSBs during the war, so there was scope for consultancy work, but the Clinic staff also planned to become a part of the National Health Service when it was established, and they had been warned that such consultancy and research would not be possible under the auspices of the NHS. Because of this, the Tavistock Institute of Human Relations was created in 1947 to carry out work specifically with organisations once the Clinic was incorporated into the NHS. The Rockefeller Foundation awarded a significant grant that facilitated the creation of the institute.

In the early years, income was derived from research grants, contract work, and fees for professional development courses. During the 1950s and 1960s, the institute carried out a number of signature projects in collaboration with major manufacturing companies including Unilever, the Ahmedabad Manufacturing and Calico Printing Co., Shell, Bayer, and Glacier Metals. They also conducted work for the National Coal Board. Particular focuses included management, women in the workplace, and the adoption (or rejection) of new technologies. Projects on the interaction between people and technology later became known as the sociotechnical approach.

The 1950s also saw the institute conducting consumer research and exploring attitudes to things as varied as Bovril, fish fingers, coffee and hair.

In the 1960s and 1970s, there was a notable focus on public health organisations such as hospitals. Studies examined a range of aspects of healthcare, from ward management and operating theatres to the organisation of cleaning staff.

More recently, the institute has conducted work for the European Commission and British government bodies.

Research units 
In the institute's early years, there were four main units: Programme Groups A and B within a Committee on Human Resources; Organisation and Social Change and Operations Research Unit; and a Committee on Family and Community Psychiatry.

The Human Resources Centre (HRC) and the Centre for Applied Social Research (CASR) were established in the 1950s, and in 1963 the Institute of Operational Research (IOR) was established in conjunction with the British Operational Research Society. The Centre for Organisational and Operational Research (COOR) was created from a merger of the HRC and the IOR in 1979.

The Self Help Alliance project begun in the 1980s led to further work in evaluation and the creation of a dedicated unit, the Evaluation Development Review Unit (EDRU) in 1990.

Key figures 
The institute was founded by a group of key figures from the Tavistock Clinic and British Army psychiatry including Elliott Jaques, Henry Dicks, Leonard Browne, Ronald Hargreaves, John Rawlings Rees, Mary Luff and Wilfred Bion, with Tommy Wilson as chairman. Other well-known people that joined the group shortly after were Isabel Menzies Lyth, J. D. Sutherland, John Bowlby, Eric Trist, and Fred Emery. Although he died before the TIHR was formally established, Kurt Lewin was an important influence on the work of the Tavistock: he was a notable influence on Trist, and contributed an article to the first issue of Human Relations.

Many of the members of the Tavistock Institute went on to play major roles in psychology. John Rawlings Rees became first president of the World Federation for Mental Health. Jock Sutherland became director of the new post-war Tavistock Clinic, when it was incorporated into the newly established British National Health Service in 1946. Ronald Hargreaves became deputy director of the World Health Organization. Tommy Wilson became chairman of the Tavistock Institute. One of the most influential figures to emerge from the institute was the psychoanalyst Isabel Menzies Lyth. Her seminal paper 'A case study in the functioning of social systems as a defence against anxiety' (1959) inspired a whole branch of organisational theory emphasising unconscious forces that shape organizational life. A.K. Rice did considerable work on problems of management, increasing productivity at one factory by 300%. Eric Miller became director of the Group Relation Program in 1969, and in this function he later developed the design of the Nazareth-Conferences.

The Tavistock Institute became known as a major proponent in Britain for psychoanalysis and the psychodynamic theories of Sigmund Freud and his followers. Other names associated with the Tavistock include Melanie Klein, Carl Gustav Jung, J. A. Hadfield, Charles Rycroft, Enid Mumford and R. D. Laing.

Current activities
The Tavistock Institute engages in educational, research, consultancy, project evaluation and professional development work in the social sciences and applied psychology. Its clients are diverse, ranging from public sector organisations, including the European Union, many British government departments, Third Sector and private clients. The institute owns Human Relations, the international social sciences journal. It also edits the journal Evaluation.

Tavistock for the workplace
The techniques used to rehabilitate soldiers were believed by some researchers to be applicable to a more human-centered organisation of work in industry by empowering lower ranking employees. This agenda helped showcase the two sociotechnical scholarship attributes: the close association of technological and social systems and also, the importance of worker involvement.

References

Further reading
Tavistock Institute website
Trist, Eric L. et al. The Social Engagement of Social Science: A Tavistock Anthology : The Socio-Ecological Perspective (Tavistock Anthology), University of Pennsylvania, May 1997. 
Young, Robert M. "The Culture of British Psychoanalysis"
The Tavistock Institute Archive blog
Festival celebrating 70 years: Reimagining Human Relations in our Time

1947 establishments in the United Kingdom
Organizations established in 1947
Psychoanalysis organizations
Psychology institutes
Systems psychology
History of mental health in the United Kingdom
Research institutes in the United Kingdom
Psychology organisations based in the United Kingdom